Kunturiri (Aymara kunturi condor, -(i)ri a suffix, Hispanicized spelling Condoriri) is a  mountain in the Bolivian Andes. It is located in the La Paz Department, Loayza Province, Malla Municipality. Kunturiri is situated south-west of the mountains Wila Willk'i and Quta Qutani (Kkota Kkotani). It lies west of the village of Kunturiri (Condoriri).

References 

Mountains of La Paz Department (Bolivia)